Roshni is a Pakistani television soap opera which aired on Geo Entertainment. First episode was aired on 24 October 2016. Serial stars Maham Amir, Kamran Jilani as Protagonists and Nazli Nasr as Antagonist. Soap aired throughout weekdays with half an hour episode.

Cast
Maham Amir
Kamran Jilani
Nazli Nasr
Sajid Shah
Shan Baig
Aroha Khan
Sarah Razi
Humaira Zahid
Ali Rajput
ARUJ KAZMI

References

2016 Pakistani television series debuts
Pakistani television series
Pakistani television soap operas
Geo TV original programming